F-Factor is a high fiber diet plan created by Registered Dietitian Tanya Zuckerbrot. It includes a diet plan, a branded food line, books, and other products. The diet focuses on consumption of lean proteins and high-fiber carbohydrates.

History

The F-Factor brand was created by New York dietitian Tanya Zuckerbrot, who developed the plan after gaining 24 pounds and decided to start eating in accordance with the dietary advice she shared with her clients. The diet consisted of high-fiber carbs and lean protein, which became the base for The F-Factor Diet plan. In 2006, she published the book, The F-Factor Diet, which outlined the F-Factor plan. She would go on to expand her private practice in New York one year later.
 
In 2011, F-Factor foods began being served in restaurants. 

The diet was endorsed by Megyn Kelly in her 2016 autobiography, Settle for More, in which Kelly stated she used the diet after giving birth, in order to address weight gained during pregnancy.

In 2018, F-Factor launched a line of all-natural fiber-rich products.

Overview

The F-Factor Diet incorporates four principles which include eating fiber-rich carbohydrates, dining out, social drinking, and working out less.  It advocates using lean proteins with high-fiber carbohydrates.  The plan focuses on curbing the feelings of hunger and deprivation commonly associated with dieting. The "F" stands for fiber, which is a non-digestible part of carbohydrates and helps people feel full. The diet does not require users to cut out fat, carbs, or alcohol.
 
F-Factor also provides nutritional counseling services and has its own brand of food and recipes.

Reception

The F-Factor Diet book was reviewed by Publishers Weekly " and criticized by the New York Times''' Emily Gellis Lande

See also

F-plan
Pritikin diet

References

Further reading

 The F-Factor Diet: Discover the Secret to Permanent Weight Loss, Tanya Zuckerbrot (2007), 
 The Miracle Carb Diet: Make Calories and Fat Disappear--with Fiber!'', Tanya Zuckerbrot (2012),

External links
 F-Factor Diet website

Diets
High-fiber diets
Brand name diet products